Viškovići is a small hamlet in the south eastern Labinština peninsula in Istria County, Croatia. The total population is 171 persons and 109 houses.

References

Populated places in Istria County